Miklavž Komelj (born 10 July 1973) is a Slovene poet and art historian.

Komelj was born in Kranj in 1973. He studied History of Art at the University of Ljubljana and started publishing poetry in 1991.

In 2006 he won the Jenko Award for his poetry collection Hipodrom and in 2010 the Prešeren Foundation Award for his poetry collection Nenaslovljiva imena. In 2011 he received the Rožanc Award for Nujnost poezije.

Poetry collections

 Luč delfina (1991)
 Jantar časa (1995)
 Rosa (2002)
 Hipodrom (2006)
 Nenaslovljiva imena (2008)
Modra obleka (2011)
Roke v dežju (2011)
Noč je abstraktnejša kot N (2014)
 ''* ‘‘Minima impossibilia‘‘ (2016)
Liebestod (2017)
11 (2018)
Stigmatizacija (2019)
Goreča knjiga (2020)

Books of prose

Sovjetska knjiga (2012)
Larvae (2019)
Skrij me, sneg (2021)

Book of essays

Nujnost poezije (2010)

References

https://www.tupeloquarterly.com/ancient-modern-racetracks-an-interview-with-translator-dan-rosenberg-on-miklavz-komeljs-hippodrome-conducted-by-zach-savich/

Slovenian poets
Slovenian male poets
Slovenian art historians
Living people
1973 births
Writers from Kranj
Veronika Award laureates
University of Ljubljana alumni